St Richard Gwyn Roman Catholic High School may refer to:
St Richard Gwyn Catholic High School, Flint
St Richard Gwyn Catholic High School, Barry